The second season of Canadian Idol debuted on June 1, 2004, and became the most watched show in Canada, drawing in over 3 million viewers each week.

Auditions were held in Toronto, Montreal, Vancouver, Ottawa, Edmonton, Winnipeg, Halifax, Regina, and St. John's.  The season provided an Idol first when the final six contestants played their own instruments during a group performance of the Gordon Lightfoot classic "Canadian Railroad Trilogy".  This was the first time that contestants on any Idol series had performed with instruments;

Kalan Porter of Medicine Hat, Alberta won the series, and Theresa Sokyrka of Saskatoon, Saskatchewan was the runner-up. In November 2004, merely two months after the competition, Porter released his debut album entitled 219 Days – the number days spanning from his first audition to the release of his CD.  Other season two finalists who released albums include Sokyrka, Jacob Hoggard (with his band Hedley), Jason Greeley, Shane Wiebe, and Joshua Seller.

Semifinals

Semifinal Group 1 (16 June 2004)

Notes
 Joshua Seller and Brandy Callahan advanced to the top 10 of the competition. The other 6 contestants were eliminated.
 Kyla Sandulak and Raj Ramawad returned for a second chance at the top 10 in the Wildcard Round.

Semifinal Group 2 (23 June 2004)

Notes
 Kalan Porter and Kaleb Simmonds advanced to the top 10 of the competition. The other 6 contestants were eliminated.
 Liz Titan and Elena Juatco returned for a second chance at the top 10 in the Wildcard Round.

Semifinal Group 3 (30 June 2004)

Notes
 Theresa Sokyrka and Jacob Hoggard advanced to the top 10 of the competition. The other 6 contestants were eliminated.
 Andrew Broderick and Bernard Quilala returned for a second chance at the top 10 in the Wildcard Round.

Semifinal Group 4 (7 July 2004)

Notes
 Shane Wiebe and Manoah Hartman advanced to the top 10 of the competition. The other 6 contestants were eliminated.
 Jason Greeley and Ted Senecal returned for a second chance at the top 10 in the Wildcard Round.

Wildcard (14 July 2004)

Notes
 Jason Greeley and Elena Juatco received the most votes, and completed the top 10.

Finals

Top 10 (21 July 2004)
Theme: Canadian Hits

Top 9 (28 July 2004)
Theme: British Invasion

Top 8 (4 August 2004)
Theme: Rock & Roll

Top 7 (11 August 2004)
Theme: Lionel Richie

Top 6 (18 August 2004)
Theme: Gordon Lightfoot

Top 5 (25 August 2004)
Theme: Summertime Hits

Top 4 (1 September 2004)
Theme: Standards

Top 3 (8 September 2004)
Theme: Judge's Choice

Top 2 (15 September 2004)

Elimination Chart

Releases

Kalan Porter
"Awake in a Dream" (Single, 2004)
219 Days (Album, 2004)
"Single" (Single, 2004)
"In Spite of It All" (Single, 2005)
Wake Up Living (Album, 2007)
"Down In Heaven" (Single, 2007)
"Destination (Where I Belong)" (Single, 2007)
"Hurray" (Single, 2008)

Theresa Sokyrka
 Four Hours in November (EP, 2004)
These Old Charms (Album, 2005)
"Turned My Back" (Single, 2005)
Something Is Expected (Album, 2006)
 "Waiting Song" (Single, 2006)
 "Sandy Eyes" (Single, 2007)
Wrapped in Ribbon (Album, 2007)
 "Baby, It's Cold Outside" (Single, 2007)
Theresa Sokyrka – Ukrainian Roots  (Album, 2010)
 "Everything" (Single, 2010)
Prairie Winds  (Album, 2013)

Jacob Hoggard
Hedley (Album, 2005)
"On My Own" (Single, 2005)
"Villain" (Single, 2005)
"Trip" (Single, 2005)
"321" (Single, 2006)
"Gunnin'" (Single, 2006)
"Street Fight" (Single, 2006)
Famous Last Words (Album, 2007)
 "She's So Sorry" (Single, 2007)
"For the Nights I Can't Remember" (Single, 2007)
"Never Too Late" (Single, 2008)
"Old School" (Single, 2008)
"Dying to Live Again" (Single, 2008)
Never Too Late (Album, 2009)
The Show Must Go (Album, 2009)
"Cha-Ching" (Single, 2009)
"Don't Talk to Strangers" (Single, 2009)
 "Perfect" (Single, 2009)
"Hands Up" (Single, 2010)
"Sweater Song" (Single, 2010)
Go with the Show (Album, 2010)
Storms (Album, 2011)
"Invincible" (Single, 2011)
"One Life"  (Single, 2011)
"Kiss You Inside Out" (Single, 2012)
"Anything" (Single, 2013)
Wild Life (Album, 2014)
"Crazy for You" (Single, 2014)
"Heaven in Our Headlights" (Single, 2014)
"Pocket Full of Dreams" (Single, 2014)
"Lost in Translation" (Single, 2015)
Hello (Album, 2015)
"Hello" (Single, 2015)
"Lose Control" (Single, 2016)
"Can't Slow Down" (Single, 2016)
"Love Again" (Single, 2017)
Cageless (Album, 2017)
"Better Days" (Single, 2017)

Jason Greeley
Live...Love...Sing... (Album, 2005)
Jason Greeley (Album, 2009)

Shane Wiebe
Shane Wiebe (Album, 2005)
 "When I am With You" (Single, 2005)
 "What Child Is This?" (Single, 2005)
Into Your Light (Album, 2009)
Christmas With You (Album, 2009)
 "Christmas With You" (Single, 2009)
Restore the Wonder (Album, 2010)

Kaleb Simmonds
The Lesson - Vol. 1 (Album, 2005)
The Life of the 80's Baby (Album, 2006)

Joshua Seller
Starving For Attention (Album, 2005)
My King is Coming (Album, 2010)
"Come To Save" (Single, 2010)

Other Contestants
"A Friend for Life" (Jerrica Santos on My Little Pony: Equestria Girls)

References

2004 Canadian television seasons
2
2004 in Canadian music